This inclusive list of opera companies in Africa and the Middle East contains opera companies with entries in the Wikipedia plus other particularly noted companies based in these regions.  For opera companies from other continents, see List of important opera companies.

Opera Companies in Africa

Egypt

Nigeria

South Africa

Opera Companies in the Middle East

Israel

Oman

Syria

 
Companies